Grégory Bourdy (born 25 April 1982) is a French professional golfer who competes on the European Tour.

Career
Bourdy was born in Bordeaux. He turned professional in 2003. His cousin Nicolas Beaufils is also a professional golfer, who has played on the Challenge Tour.

Bourdy has played on the European Tour full-time since 2005, having previously competed on the second-tier Challenge Tour. Bourdy won his first European Tour event on 28 October 2007 at the Mallorca Classic. That win helped him to finish 39th on the European Tour's Order of Merit list, the first time he had broken the top 100. He has been the highest ranked French golfer on the Official World Golf Rankings.

Bourdy also has three victories on the Alps Tour, one of Europe's third-tier development tours, between 2003 and 2005, and won the South African PGA Championship on the Sunshine Tour in 2006. Bourdy was also a member of the France team that finished in 2nd place at the 2002 Eisenhower Trophy.

After his first European Tour win at the 2007 Mallorca Classic, Bourdy collected another victory at the Estoril Open de Portugal in 2008.

In November 2009, Bourdy held off the challenge of Rory McIlroy to win the UBS Hong Kong Open by two strokes.

At the Lyoness Open in June 2015, Bourdy held a two-stroke advantage going into the final round, having led from day one. However, in the final round he shot a six-over-par 78 that included five bogeys and a double bogey to finish in a tie for sixth.

In 2016, Bourdy finished T18 at both the U.S. Open and the PGA Championship – his best finishes at major championships to date – and shared 21st place at the Olympic Games in Brazil.

Amateur wins
2002 Scottish Youths Amateur Open Championship

Professional wins (10)

European Tour wins (4)

1Co-sanctioned by the Asian Tour

European Tour playoff record (1–0)

Sunshine Tour wins (1)

Alps Tour wins (3)

French Tour wins (2)

Results in major championships

CUT = missed the halfway cut
"T" indicates a tie for a place.

Results in World Golf Championships
Results not in chronological order before 2015.

"T" = Tied
Note that the HSBC Champions did not become a WGC event until 2009.

Team appearances
Amateur
European Boys' Team Championship (representing France): 1999
European Youths' Team Championship (representing France): 2002
Eisenhower Trophy (representing France): 2002

Professional
World Cup (representing France): 2008, 2011, 2013
Seve Trophy (representing Continental Europe): 2013 (winners)

References

External links

French male golfers
European Tour golfers
Olympic golfers of France
Golfers at the 2016 Summer Olympics
Mediterranean Games gold medalists for France
Mediterranean Games medalists in golf
Competitors at the 2001 Mediterranean Games
Sportspeople from Bordeaux
1982 births
Living people
21st-century French people